Tony Dandrades (born June 17, 1968 in Santo Domingo, Dominican Republic) is a Dominican journalist and television personality who works at the Univision Network. He is currently the entertainment reporter/anchor for the five o'clock news magazine show Primer Impacto.

Career
On finishing his studies in communication at the Interamerican University in Puerto Rico, Tony developed his skills at Puerto Rican television and radio stations before he found new opportunities on the radio in Miami. Then he took his big step into the South Florida Univision affiliate.

Dandrades worked for five years as weekend weatherman at Channel 23 in Miami. He was notorious for his live reports from festivals and cultural events, in which he mixed weather reporting with entertainment. He gained a huge following with Miami residents because of his spontaneous and charismatic style of reporting.

In 1997, Tony Dandrades left Channel 23 to work on Primer Impacto, one of the top-ranked programs on the network. With his characteristic style and hilarious antics, his interviews have always gone beyond just informing to reveal the many dimensions of the audience’s favorite artists. He has shown his fearlessness and impartiality in handling controversial issues, as well as sensitivity when working in the team coverage of the September 11 situation. 
 
Dandrades has traveled extensively throughout Latin America and across the U.S. covering stories for “Primer Impacto” and “Ver Para Creer”, the weekend magazine highlighting unbelievable stories. He has broadcast from the last four World Cup tournaments in Korea and Japan, Germany, South Africa and Brazil. He has  also hosted events and festivals, lending his time  to telethons and other charity events.

References

1968 births
Living people
People from Santo Domingo
Dominican Republic journalists
Male journalists
Dominican Republic television presenters